Timanus is a surname. Notable people with the surname include: 

E. Clay Timanus (1863–1923), mayor of Baltimore
Eddie Timanus (born 1968), American sportswriter and game show contestant
George Loutrell Timanus (1892–1981), American physician and abortionist
Gustavus B. Timanus (1865–1941), former mayor of Laurel, Maryland